South Walsham Fen is a   Local Nature Reserve west of South Walsham in Norfolk. It is owned and managed by Norfolk County Council.

This nature reserve has semi-improved grassland and species-rich hedges which mark an ancient track. There are also areas of bracken and ancient woodland.

There is public access to the site.

References

Local Nature Reserves in Norfolk